Giorgio Morini (born 11 October 1947) is an Italian former football manager and player, who played as a midfielder. As a player, Morini was part of the A.C. Milan team that won the 1978–79 Serie A title. He also coached the Italian football team Milan for part of the 1996–97 season.

Club career 
Born in Carrara, Morini started his career with Inter during the 1967–68 season, but never played a game for the side. The following year he moved to A.S. Varese 1910, spending four seasons with the club. He made his Serie A debut against Cagliari on 6 October 1968.

After moving to A.S. Roma in 1972, Morini made a name for himself, representing the capital side for the next four seasons. In 1976, he earned a contract with A.C. Milan, spending another four seasons there, and winning the Scudetto in 1979.

After two seasons at minor club Pro Patria and a short spell with low-league team FC Chiasso, Morini ended his career in 1984.

International career 
He played 3 games for the Italy national football team in 1975, making his debut on 19 April against Poland.

Controversy 
Morini was linked to the 1980 Totonero illegal Italian football gambling scandal, and was suspended from play for ten months.

Managerial career 
Giorgio Morini took up coaching, once his active career came to an end, leading youth-teams to glory, primarily at Italian club A.C. Milan. When Óscar Tabárez was fired from the Rossonero senior side in 1996, Morini took over for a short period during the 1996–97 Serie A season; that was his first and, until now, last run as a coach of a top-flight side.

References

1947 births
Living people
Italian footballers
Italy international footballers
Serie A players
Serie B players
Inter Milan players
S.S.D. Varese Calcio players
A.S. Roma players
A.C. Milan players
Aurora Pro Patria 1919 players
FC Chiasso players
A.C. Milan managers
Association football midfielders
Italian football managers